Sayam Sandhya is a 1986 Indian Malayalam-language film, directed by  Joshiy and produced by Thiruppathi Chettiyar. The film stars Mammootty, Geetha, Monisha and Suresh Gopi. The film has musical score by Shyam. The film was a major commercial failure.

Cast

Mammootty as Sivaprasad
Suresh Gopi as Ravi
Geetha as Uma
Monisha as Vinu
K. P. Ummer as Sivaprasad's Father
Geethu Mohandas as Young Vinu
M. G. Soman as Sivaprasad's Brother
Srividya as Geetha
Ashokan as Narendran
Baiju as Tea Supplier
Viji
K. P. A. C. Azeez
Paravoor Bharathan as Iyer
T. K. Balachandran as Judge

Soundtrack

Box office
The film was a commercial failure.

References

External links
 

1986 films
1980s Malayalam-language films
Films directed by Joshiy